Mittonia carcassoni is a species of snout moth, and the type species in the genus Mittonia. It was described by Whalley in 1964, and is known from Uganda (including Entebbe).

References

Moths described in 1964
Pyralinae